Alexsander Jhonatta de Oliveira Andrade commonly known as Alexsander (born 6 September 1998) is a Brazilian professional footballer who plays for Vitória.

Career
Alexsander signed with USL Championship side Swope Park Rangers on 31 January 2019 on a season-long loan from Athletico Paranaense.

References

External links 
 Swope Park Rangers Profile

1998 births
Living people
Brazilian footballers
Brazilian expatriate footballers
Cruzeiro Esporte Clube players
Esporte Clube Jacuipense players
Club Athletico Paranaense players
Sporting Kansas City II players
Esporte Clube Vitória players
Association football midfielders
USL Championship players
Brazilian expatriate sportspeople in the United States
Expatriate soccer players in the United States